The Bullerwell Lecture is an annual award from the British Geophysical Association (BGA) bestowed on an individual for significant contribution to the field of geophysics. Scientists of any nationality but working in an academic institution in the United Kingdom qualify for the award. The award is named in honour of William Bullerwell.

Laureates
Notable recipients include 

 2018: Tom Mitchell from University College London
 2014: Catherine Rychert
 2013: Derek Keir 
 2003: John-Michael Kendall
 2000: James Jackson
 1993 Kathryn Whaler 
 1992: Bob White 
 1982: Dan McKenzie

See also

 List of geophysics awards

References

Geophysics awards